Ali Baba and the Forty Thieves is a folk tale about Ali Baba, a character from Arabian literature.

Ali Baba and the Forty Thieves and variants may also refer to:

Films
Ali Baba and the Forty Thieves (1902 film), a 1902 French film directed by Ferdinand Zecca
Ali Baba and the Forty Thieves (1918 film), a 1918 American film directed by Chester Franklin and Sidney Franklin
Ali Baba and the Forty Thieves (1944 film), a 1944 adventure film directed by Arthur Lubin
Ali Baba and the Forty Thieves (1954 film), a 1954 French film directed by Jacques Becker
Alibaba and 40 Thieves (1954 film), a 1954 Hindi film directed by Homi Wadia
Alibaba and 40 Thieves (1966 film), a 1966 Hindi film directed by Homi Wadia
Ali Baba and the Forty Thieves (1971 film), a 1971 Japanese film directed by Hiroshi
 Alibabayum 41 Kallanmaarum, a Malayalam film directed by J. Sasikumar

Video games
Ali Baba and 40 Thieves (video game), a maze arcade game released by Sega in 1982
Ali Baba and the Forty Thieves (video game), a 1981 computer role-playing game for the Atari 8-bit and Apple II family computers

Other uses
 Ali Baba and the Forty Thieves (album), Bing Crosby album

See also
 Ali Baba (disambiguation)